The Great Britain national bandy team represents the United Kingdom in international bandy for men since 2019. There used to be a team England in international bandy in the late 19th and early 20th centuries, but when Britain eventually came back to the sport, it was decided to do it under the name Great Britain.

Early days: 1890s to 1910s
An England national bandy team was formed in the years around 1900. It was a natural consequence of England being the birthplace of bandy in the 19th century, bandy often being seen as the winter equivalent to either association football or field hockey. Early international games were played against the Netherlands, Germany and France.

The bandy team represented England in the 1913 European Bandy Championships in Davos, Switzerland. It was credited with winning the eight-nation tournament. At the time, bandy in England was administrated through the National Bandy Association.

The societal upheavals due to World War I then ended the interest for bandy in Britain.

Present time: 2010s and 2020s
After almost a hundred years, a new national federation for bandy was formed. The Bandy Federation of England joined the Federation of International Bandy in 2010 and England aimed to play in the World Championships in the coming years. Debuting in 2018 was the goal.

The federation changed names to England Bandy Federation in January 2017 and to Great Britain Bandy Association in September 2017. The Great Britain national bandy team made its debut at the 2019 Bandy World Championship in Sweden and managed to become runners-up in the B Division in its début championship tournament, but could not attend the 2020 World Championship in Russia due to problems getting visas for the players. The early 2020s has since seen a hiatus in international play due to the COVID-19 pandemic.

References 

National bandy teams
Bandy
Bandy in the United Kingdom